No Sikiriki is Edo Maajka's second studio album released on May 3, 2004, by Menart records in Croatia, Fmjam records and Malex Music in Bosnia and Bassivity Music in Serbia.  In 2005, the album won numerous awards from different award ceremonies including album of the year and song of the year for the title track. It was the most anticipated hip hop album after the hit album slusaj mater.

The album
This album has a number of themes that were also featured in the previous album. Themes include war, post war issues, social commentary and storytelling and sequels to songs that were in previous albums.

Track listing

References

2004 albums
Edo Maajka albums